Lucien Yann Sherril Aubey (born 24 May 1984) is a Congolese former footballer who played as a defender.

Career
Aubey was born in Brazzaville, Republic of the Congo. He confirmed he wanted to leave Toulouse after eight years of service with them, and joined finally Racing Club de Lens (5 July).

On 18 January 2008, he joined English Premier League side Portsmouth on loan for the rest of the season. He made few appearances, and was not bought by the English club.

On 5 August 2008, he joined Stade Rennais FC for a three years contract. The Turkey club Sivasspor has, in fact ended the purchase, from Rennes, of the central defender. He has signed a deal until June 2011 with an option for another year.

International career
Aubey played for France U-21 in the 2006 UEFA European Under-21 Football Championship. He made a full international debut for Congo on 12 August 2009 in a friendly against Morocco.

References

External reference
 Lucien Aubey's profile, stats & pics 
 
 
 
 
 

1984 births
Living people
Sportspeople from Brazzaville
France under-21 international footballers
Expatriate footballers in England
French footballers
French expatriate footballers
Republic of the Congo emigrants to France
Republic of the Congo footballers
Republic of the Congo international footballers
Republic of the Congo expatriate footballers
Association football defenders
Ligue 1 players
Ligue 2 players
Süper Lig players
Cypriot First Division players
Portsmouth F.C. players
Premier League players
RC Lens players
Toulouse FC players
Stade Rennais F.C. players
Sivasspor footballers
Olympiakos Nicosia players
Expatriate footballers in Turkey
Expatriate footballers in Cyprus